Clarke's weaver (Ploceus golandi) is a species of bird in the family Ploceidae.
It is endemic to Kenya.

Its natural habitat is subtropical or tropical moist lowland forests.
It is threatened by habitat loss.

The species is named after Captain Goland Clarke, brother of Stephenson Robert Clarke, who described the species.

References

External links
 Clarke's weaver -  Species text in Weaver Watch.

Ploceus
Endemic birds of Kenya
Birds described in 1913
Taxa named by Stephenson Robert Clarke
Taxonomy articles created by Polbot
Northern Zanzibar–Inhambane coastal forest mosaic